Pušče is a small village to the west above Male Lašče in the Municipality of Velike Lašče in central Slovenia. The entire Municipality of Velike Lašče is part of the traditional region of Lower Carniola and is now included in the Central Slovenia Statistical Region.

References

External links
Pušče on Geopedia

Populated places in the Municipality of Velike Lašče